Samuel Brooks House may refer to:

Samuel Brooks House (Cornwall, New York), listed on the NRHP in New York
Samuel Wallace Brooks House, Brownsville, Texas, listed on the NRHP in Cameron County, Texas
Samuel Brooks House (Massachusetts), Concord, Massachusetts

See also
Brooks House (disambiguation)